Eeg or EEG may refer to:

People 
 Harald Rosenløw Eeg (born 1970), Norwegian writer
 Sinne Eeg (born 1977), Danish musician
 Syvert Omundsen Eeg (1757–1838), Norwegian politician

Other uses 
 Eastern European Group, in the United Nations
 Electroencephalography
 Emirates Environmental Group
 Enterprise encryption gateway
 Emperor Entertainment Group, a Hong Kong-based entertainment company of Emperor Group
 German Renewable Energy Sources Act, of the Government of Germany